Introducing Evolution is a 2001 graphic study guide to Evolution written by Dylan Evans and illustrated by Howard Selina. The volume, according to the publisher's website, "provides a step-by-step guide to ‘Darwin’s dangerous idea’ and takes a fresh look at the often misunderstood concepts of natural selection and the selfish gene."

Publication history
This volume was originally published in the UK by Icon Books in 2001, and subsequently republished with different covers and the subtitle, A Graphic Guide.

Editions:

Related volumes in the series:

Reception
Science writer Brian Clegg, author of Introducing Infinity (2012) in the same series, states that, "book works well as an introduction to the subject," and is, "a solid addition to the series though not an outstanding one." "The text flows nicely," and, Clegg continues, "isn't limited to the pure consideration of evolution by natural selection." "The images," which Clegg contends, "are always important in one of these books", "work well." Clegg concludes that this volume is superior to the earlier Darwin for Beginners, in the same series, as it, "covers the science better," and, "makes better use of the illustrated 'Introducing' format."

References

Popular science books
Non-fiction graphic novels
Educational comics
2001 in comics